Ken Bradfield (born 3 February 1929) is a Canadian former sailor who competed in the 1952 Summer Olympics.

References

1929 births
Living people
Canadian male sailors (sport)
Olympic sailors of Canada
Sailors at the 1952 Summer Olympics – 6 Metre
Place of birth missing (living people)